Storybook most often refers to children's literature.

Storybook may also refer to:

Arts, entertainment, and media

Literature
 Disney's Animated Storybook, a 1995 series of point-and-click interactive storybooks
 Interactive storybook, a children's story packaged with animated graphics, sound or other interactive elements
 Shirley Temple's Storybook, a U.S. TV series
 The Jesus Storybook Bible, a children's Bible written by Sally Lloyd-Jones
 The Little Endless Storybook, a picture book by Jill Thompson

Music

Groups and labels
 Story Books, an English band

Albums and EPs
 Storybook (Kasey Chambers album), 2011
 Storybook (Peter Jöback album), 2004
 A Coloring Storybook and Long-Playing Record, an EP by American band Cinematic Sunrise
 The Adult Storybook, a 2009 album by New Tokyo Terror
 The Supersonic Storybook, a 1991 album by American band Urge Overkill

Songs
 "Storybook", a song in The Scarlet Pimpernel

Television
 Cartoon Storybook, a 1959 Canadian children's television series
 Dancing Storybook, a 1959 Canadian children's television series
 HBO Storybook Musicals, a series of television specials
 Storybook International, a British children's television series
 Storybook Squares, a special series of episodes of the NBC game show Hollywood Squares
 Storybook World, an animated series that was released on VHS tape
 The Storybook Series with Hayley Mills, a 1986 American animated television/video series

Other arts, entertainment, and media
 Storybook Weaver, a 1994 educational game for the Apple Macintosh

Attractions and parks
 Sindbad's Storybook Voyage, a dark ride in boats at Tokyo DisneySea
 Storybook Glen, a children's park in Maryculter, Scotland
 Storybook Land, a family amusement park located in Egg Harbor Township, New Jersey, United States
 Storybook Land Canal Boats, an attraction located at more than one Disneyland theme park
 Storybook Gardens, in Springbank Park

Education and literacy
 African Storybook, a literacy initiative in Africa

Organizations
 Clockwork Storybook, a former writer's collective and independent book publisher based in Austin, Texas
 Storybook Dads, a UK charity which promotes adult literacy

Other uses
 Storybook house, an architectural style popularized in the 1920s in England and United States
 Wanderful Interactive Storybooks, a developer of interactive storybook apps